Keiko Osaki (born 15 October 1942) is a Japanese diver. She competed at the 1964 Summer Olympics, the 1968 Summer Olympics and the 1972 Summer Olympics.

References

1942 births
Living people
Japanese female divers
Olympic divers of Japan
Divers at the 1964 Summer Olympics
Divers at the 1968 Summer Olympics
Divers at the 1972 Summer Olympics
Place of birth missing (living people)
Asian Games medalists in diving
Divers at the 1966 Asian Games
Asian Games gold medalists for Japan
Medalists at the 1966 Asian Games
20th-century Japanese women